Count Five and Die is a 1957 British war drama produced by Zonic Productions and released in the USA by the Twentieth Century-Fox Film Corporation.  It was directed by Victor Vicas, produced by Ernest Gartside with the screenplay by Jack Seddon and David Pursall. It stars Jeffrey Hunter, Nigel Patrick and Annemarie Düringer.

Plot 
In 1944 London, Major Julien Howard (Nigel Patrick), a British MI6 intelligence agent, meets Captain Bill Ranson (Jeffrey Hunter), his new American security officer. As Howard was previously picked up by German Abwehr counter-intelligence, Ranson soon realizes that their assignment is to feed misinformation to the Germans about the location of the D-Day landings; they are to make it look like it will be in the occupied Netherlands. Howard tells him the rest of the unit must not know the truth.

One night, while on a date with Rolande Hertog, the unit's radio operator, Ranson becomes concerned and returns to the offices. He is shot at and wounds an intruder. He leaves the unconscious man with Hertog to search further but the man's accomplice gets away. Hertog kills the captive, claiming he tried to grab her gun. A romance quickly develops between Ranson and Hertog the same night. When Ranson gets back to the office, Howard criticises his actions; MI5 had tipped him off that the Germans were planning to search his offices, so he made it easy for them to get the planted misinformation, until Ranson intervened. Further, he suspects that Hertog is a German agent; Jan Guldt, their liaison with the Dutch underground, had been sent back to The Netherlands, only to be captured immediately. Ranson does not believe it.

Howard sends Piet van Wijt to The Netherlands, supposedly to evaluate the effects of a bombing raid, but actually to test Hertog. They do not hear from van Wijt again. Meanwhile, Howard receives news that the Germans are redeploying troops into the country.

Howard orders Ranson to keep seeing Hertog so she will not become suspicious but Ranson is an unconvincing actor. Now suspicious, Hertog goes to her sector commander, Hauptman Hans Faber, who is posing as a dentist. Faber is not fully convinced by her claim that it is all a fraud but needs to make sure. He arranges for the young son of Dr Mulder, Howard's psychological warfare expert, to be kidnapped. Mulder is forced to reveal the supposed invasion location to save his boy's life. However, he later confides to Hertog that he does not believe that the Netherlands is the place. The two men who were sent behind enemy lines were not given poisonous cyanide capsules to avoid capture. If they had, they could have taken them; then they could "count five and die". She tells Muller to go home, that she will alert Ranson. Instead, she tries once more to persuade Faber to change his mind but without success.

Howard and Ranson speak to Mulder and realise the situation. They manage to capture Faber and free Mulder's son although Martins gets away and Faber bites his cyanide capsule. Meanwhile, Ranson tracks down Hertog but not before she sends a radio message unmasking the deception. Ranson takes a big gamble, telling her that she did exactly what they wanted her to do and that it was all a "double bluff", then lets her grab a pistol and forces her to shoot him by advancing on her. She transmits a second message, then leaves, believing Ranson to be dead. He is still alive, however. Martins then shoots Hertog.

The epilogue states that on D-Day, "ten German divisions were not in the line. They were north in Holland, waiting for an invasion that never came."

Cast
Jeffrey Hunter as Captain Bill Ranson
Nigel Patrick as Major Julien Howard
Annemarie Düringer as Rolande Hertog
David Kossoff as Dr. Mulder
Rolf Lefebvre as Hans Faber
Larry Burns as  Martins, the building porter and German spy
Philip Bond as Piet van Wijt, in charge of radio operations
Arthur Gross as Jan Guldt
Robert Raglan as Lieutenant Miller, a member of Howard's unit
Peter Prouse as Sergeant Bill Parrish, a member of Howard's unit
Otto Diamant as Mr. Hendrijk, who prints what his wife writes
Wolf Frees	as Brauner, the spy killed by Hertog
Anthony Ostrer		
Marianne Walla as Mrs. Hendrijk, a writer on Howard's staff
Philip Ray		
Beth Rogan	as Mary Ann Lennig, Howard's curvaceous decoder

References

External links 

1957 films
1950s war drama films
1950s spy drama films
British spy drama films
British war drama films
Films directed by Victor Vicas
Films set in 1944
Films set in London
Operation Overlord films
World War II spy films
1957 drama films
Films about the Secret Intelligence Service
British World War II films
Films shot at New Elstree Studios
1950s English-language films
1950s British films